Tsyplakov or Tsiplakov is family name of Slavic origin. It may refer to:

Daniil Tsyplakov (born 1992), Russian high jumper
Victor Tsyplakov (born 1937), Russian ice hockey player
Victor Tsiplakov (1915–1986), Russian soviet painter (see :ru:Цыплаков, Виктор Григорьевич)
Vladimir Tsyplakov (1969–2019), Belarusian ice hockey player
Ksenia Tsyplakova (born 1990), Russian luger and finalist at the FIL World Luge Championships 2011
Yelena Tsyplakova (born 1958), Russian actress and director and People's Artist of Russia (see :ru:Цыплакова, Елена Октябревна)

Slavic-language surnames